The 2017 Hong Kong Super Series was the twelfth Super Series tournament of the 2017 BWF Super Series, taking place at the Hong Kong Coliseum in Kowloon, Hong Kong from November 21 – 26 and it had a total purse of $400,000.

Men's singles

Seeds

Top half

Bottom half

Finals

Women's singles

Seeds

Top half

Bottom half

Finals

Men's doubles

Seeds

Top half

Bottom half

Finals

Women's doubles

Seeds

Top half

Bottom half

Finals

Mixed doubles

Seeds

Top half

Bottom half

Finals

References

External links
 Official Website
 Tournament Link

Hong Kong
2017 in Hong Kong sport
Hong Kong Open (badminton)
Hong Kong Super Series
International sports competitions hosted by Hong Kong